Lambert II, (669742) was possibly a Count of Haspengau (Hesbaye), generally referred to without the number modifier. The identity of his father remains uncertain, but the prevailing theories identify Lambert as either the son or paternal grandson of Robert II (Chrodobert II), Lord Chancellor of Francia.  An alternative theory would make him son of Warnius and Gunza, although this is not likely.

Lambert was married to Chrotlind, and had three children:
 Landrada, married Sigramnus, Count of Hesbaye
 Robert I, Duke of Neustria and Count of Hesbaye
 Rotrude, married Charles Martel. Grandmother of Charlemagne. (Rotrude's parentage is under dispute).

Upon his death, Lambert was succeeded as Count of Hesbaye by his son Robert.

Further reading

References

669 births
742 deaths
Counts of Hesbaye